The 1999–2000 NBA season was the 76ers' 51st season in the National Basketball Association, and 37th season in Philadelphia. During the off-season, the Sixers acquired Billy Owens from the Orlando Magic, and signed free agent Bruce Bowen. The team also replaced center Matt Geiger in the lineup with power forward Tyrone Hill. The Sixers lost their first three games and got off to an 11–12 start, as Allen Iverson missed 12 games due to a broken thumb. However, the team played above .500 as the season progressed, holding a 27–22 record at the All-Star break. At midseason, the team traded Owens and second-year guard Larry Hughes to the Golden State Warriors, and traded Bowen to the Chicago Bulls in exchange for Toni Kukoč in a three-team trade. However, Bowen never played for the Bulls and was released to free agency, and signed with the Miami Heat. The Sixers posted a 7-game winning streak in March, and won seven of their final nine games. The team finished third in the Atlantic Division with a 49–33 record.

Iverson averaged 28.4 points, 4.7 assists and 2.1 steals per game, and was named to the All-NBA Second Team, and made his first All-Star appearance as he was selected for the 2000 NBA All-Star Game in Oakland. He also finished in seventh place in Most Valuable Player voting. In addition, Hill averaged 12.0 points and 9.2 rebounds per game, while Theo Ratliff provided the team with 11.9 points, 7.6 rebounds and 3.0 blocks per game, but only played 57 games due to a stress fracture in his left ankle, George Lynch provided with 9.6 points, 7.8 rebounds and 1.6 steals per game, and Eric Snow contributed 7.9 points, 7.6 assists and 1.7 steals per game. Off the bench, Geiger averaged 9.7 points and 6.0 rebounds per game, and Aaron McKie contributed 8.0 points and 1.3 steals per game.

In the Eastern Conference First Round of the playoffs, the Sixers defeated the 4th-seeded Charlotte Hornets in four games. In the Eastern Conference Semi-finals, they faced the top-seeded Indiana Pacers, who swept them in the second round of the playoffs last year. The Pacers would defeat the Sixers in six games to advance to the Eastern Conference Finals for the fifth time in seven years, then to the NBA Finals for the first time, where they lost in six games to the Los Angeles Lakers.

For the season, the Sixers added new blue alternate road uniforms, which remained in use until 2006.

Offseason

Draft picks

Roster

Regular season

Season standings

z – clinched division title
y – clinched division title
x – clinched playoff spot

Record vs. opponents

Playoffs

|- align="center" bgcolor="#ccffcc"
| 1
| April 22
| @ Charlotte
| W 92–82
| Allen Iverson (40)
| Theo Ratliff (8)
| Eric Snow (9)
| Charlotte Coliseum15,023
| 1–0
|- align="center" bgcolor="#ffcccc"
| 2
| April 24
| @ Charlotte
| L 98–108 (OT)
| Toni Kukoč (20)
| Tyrone Hill (13)
| Eric Snow (13)
| Charlotte Coliseum11,686
| 1–1
|- align="center" bgcolor="#ccffcc"
| 3
| April 28
| Charlotte
| W 81–76
| Allen Iverson (24)
| Theo Ratliff (11)
| Aaron McKie (5)
| First Union Center20,849
| 2–1
|- align="center" bgcolor="#ccffcc"
| 4
| May 1
| Charlotte
| W 105–99
| Allen Iverson (26)
| Matt Geiger (10)
| Aaron McKie (11)
| First Union Center20,712
| 3–1
|-

|- align="center" bgcolor="#ffcccc"
| 1
| May 6
| @ Indiana
| L 91–108
| Allen Iverson (28)
| George Lynch (14)
| Eric Snow (7)
| Conseco Fieldhouse18,345
| 0–1
|- align="center" bgcolor="#ffcccc"
| 2
| May 8
| @ Indiana
| L 97–103
| Allen Iverson (28)
| Tyrone Hill (8)
| Allen Iverson (10)
| Conseco Fieldhouse18,345
| 0–2
|- align="center" bgcolor="#ffcccc"
| 3
| May 10
| Indiana
| L 89–97
| Allen Iverson (29)
| Tyrone Hill (14)
| Toni Kukoč (4)
| First Union Center20,823
| 0–3
|- align="center" bgcolor="#ccffcc"
| 4
| May 13
| Indiana
| W 92–90
| Allen Iverson (19)
| Tyrone Hill (15)
| Allen Iverson (5)
| First Union Center20,675
| 1–3
|- align="center" bgcolor="#ccffcc"
| 5
| May 15
| @ Indiana
| W 107–86
| Allen Iverson (37)
| Hill, McKie (10)
| Aaron McKie (9)
| Conseco Fieldhouse18,345
| 2–3
|- align="center" bgcolor="#ffcccc"
| 6
| May 19
| Indiana
| L 90–106
| Aaron McKie (19)
| Hill, McKie (9)
| Aaron McKie (4)
| First Union Center20,969
| 2–4
|-

Player statistics

NOTE: Please write the players statistics in alphabetical order by last name.

Season

Playoffs

Awards and records
 Allen Iverson, All-NBA Second Team

Transactions

References

Philadelphia 76ers seasons
Philadelphia
Philadelphia
Philadelphia